夜有所思，日有所夢 Thoughts in the Night, Dreams During the Day is the eleventh studio album by the cantopop singer Prudence Liew, released in December 1994.

Background information
Most of the album's songs are infused with jazz elements, especially bossa nova, with many of Hong Kong's prominent jazz composers contributing. Because the music strayed from  standard cantopop fare, only one single was released from the album. There are eight Cantonese songs and two original English compositions, one of which is a duet with a local jazz musician, Larry Hammond. The album includes two cover versions: "三十度 (Thirty Degrees)" was originally the popular song, "The Girl from Ipanema". "Love Me" is the Bee Gees' song.

With the release of this album, Liew fulfilled her contract with Columbia Records and took a break for several years, emigrating with her children to San Francisco, USA. Her next release was the mandopop album, Love Yourself 愛自己, released in Taiwan in May 2000. Her next cantopop album was 15 years after this release, in October 2009, with The Queen of Hardships.

The title of this album is a play on words of the classic Chinese saying, "日有所思，夜有所夢", which literally translates to "thoughts during the day, dreams in the night".  The interpretation of this saying is that when you think about something enough during the day, you will dream about it at night as well.

Track listing
 陪我 (Stay with Me)
 Just Hold On
 不願等﹐也… (Don't Want to Wait, Still...)
 糊塗族人 (Silly Tribesmen)
 Yours Forever
 情不死 (Love Does Not Die)
 消耗生命 (Burning Life)
 三十度 (Thirty Degrees)
 Love Me
 Whispers Of The Soul duet with Larry Hammond

References

1994 albums
Prudence Liew albums
Columbia Records albums
Bossa nova albums